The sandhill crane (Antigone canadensis) is a species of large crane of North America and extreme northeastern Siberia. The common name of this bird refers to habitat like that at the Platte River, on the edge of Nebraska's Sandhills on the American Great Plains. Sandhill Cranes are known to hangout at the edges of bodies of water especially in the Central Florida region. This is the most important stopover area for the nominotypical subspecies, the lesser sandhill crane (A. c. canadensis), with up to 450,000 of these birds migrating through annually.

Taxonomy
In 1750, English naturalist George Edwards included an illustration and a description of the sandhill crane in the third volume of his A Natural History of Uncommon Birds. He used the English name "The Brown and Ash-colour'd Crane". Edwards based his hand-coloured etching on a preserved specimen that had been brought to London from the Hudson Bay area of Canada by James Isham. When in 1758 the Swedish naturalist Carl Linnaeus updated his Systema Naturae for the tenth edition, he placed the sandhill crane with herons and cranes in the genus Ardea. Linnaeus included a brief description, coined the binomial name Ardea canadensis, and cited Edwards' work.

The sandhill crane was formerly placed in the genus Grus, but a molecular phylogenetic study published in 2010 found that the genus, as then defined, was polyphyletic. In the resulting rearrangement to create monophyletic genera, four species, including the sandhill crane, were placed in the resurrected genus Antigone that had originally been erected by the German naturalist Ludwig Reichenbach in 1853.

The specific epithet canadensis is the modern Latin word for "from Canada".

Five subspecies are recognised:

 A. c. canadensis (Linnaeus, 1758) – northeast Siberia through Alaska and north Canada to Baffin Island
 A. c. tabida (Peters, JL, 1925) – south Canada and west, central United States
 A. c. pratensis (Meyer, FAA, 1794) – Georgia and Florida
 A. c. pulla (Aldrich, 1972) – Mississippi
 A. c. nesiotes (Bangs & Zappey, 1905) – Cuba and Isla de la Juventud (Isle of Pines)

Description
Adults are gray overall; during breeding, their plumage is usually much worn and stained, particularly in the migratory populations, and looks nearly ochre. Sandhill cranes have red foreheads, white cheeks, and long, dark, pointed bills. In flight, their long, dark legs trail behind, and their long necks keep straight. Immature birds have reddish-brown upperparts and gray underparts. The sexes look alike. Wingspan is 78.7 in (200 cm).

These cranes frequently give a loud, trumpeting call that suggests a rolled "r" in the throat, and they can be heard from a long distance. Mated pairs of cranes engage in "unison calling". The cranes stand close together, calling in a synchronized and complex duet. The female makes two calls for every one from the male.

Sandhill cranes' large wingspans, typically , make them very skilled soaring birds, similar in style to hawks and eagles. Using thermals to obtain lift, they can stay aloft for many hours, requiring only occasional flapping of their wings, thus expending little energy. Migratory flocks contain hundreds of birds, and can create clear outlines of the normally invisible rising columns of air (thermals) they ride.

Sandhill cranes fly south for the winter. In their wintering areas, they form flocks over 10,000. An annual Sandhill Crane Festival is held there in November.

Fossil record
Sandhill cranes have one of the longest fossil histories of any extant bird. A 10-million-year-old crane fossil from Nebraska is said to be of this species, but this may be from a prehistoric relative or ancestor of sandhill cranes, and not belong in the genus Grus. The oldest unequivocal sandhill crane fossil is 2.5 million years old, older by half than the earliest remains of most living species of birds, primarily found from after the Pliocene/Pleistocene boundary some 1.8 million years ago. As these ancient sandhill cranes varied as much in size as present-day birds, those Pliocene fossils are sometimes described as new species. Grus haydeni may have been a prehistoric relative, or it may comprise material of a sandhill crane and its ancestor.

Subspecies and evolution

Sandhill cranes vary considerably in size (much of which is clinal) and in migratory habits. The southern subspecies (along with A. c. rowani) are intermediate, roughly according to Bergmann's rule.

Three subspecies are resident: A. c. pulla of the Gulf Coast of the U.S., A. c. pratensis of Florida and Georgia, and A. c. nesiotes of Cuba. The northern populations exist as fragmented remains in the contiguous U.S. and a large and contiguous population from Canada to Beringia. These migrate to the Southwestern United States and Mexico. These cranes are rare vagrants to China, South Korea, and Japan and very rare vagrants to Western Europe.

Six subspecies have been recognized in recent times:
Lesser sandhill crane, A. c. canadensis
Cuban sandhill crane, A. c. nesiotes – ESA: endangered
Florida sandhill crane, A. c. pratensis
Mississippi sandhill crane, A. c. pulla – ESA: endangered
Canadian sandhill crane, A. c. rowani
Greater sandhill crane, A. c. tabida

The Florida sandhill crane was listed as EC or easily confused to facilitate an attempted reintroduction of the whooping crane (Grus americana) into Florida. The attempt failed, but the listing remained. The current list of endangered subspecies includes only two birds, A. c. nesiotes and A. c. rowani, with A. c. pratensis no longer listed. Sandhill cranes occur in pastures, open prairies and freshwater wetlands in peninsular Florida from the Everglades to the Okefenokee Swamp.

Some authorities no longer recognize Canadian sandhill crane as a distinct subspecies, as insignificant genetic differentiation and minimal morphological differentiation exist between it and greater sandhill crane. The others can be somewhat more reliably distinguished in hand by measurements and plumage details, apart from the size differences already mentioned. Unequivocal identification often requires location information, which is often impossible in migrating birds.

Analysis of control region mtDNA haplotype data shows two major lineages. The Arctic and the subarctic migratory population includes the lesser sandhill cranes. The other lineages can be divided into a migratory and some indistinct clusters which can be matched to the resident subspecies. The lesser and greater sandhill cranes are quite distinct, their divergence dating to roughly 2.3–1.2 million years ago , some time during the Late Pliocene or Early Pleistocene. Glaciation seemingly fragmented off a founder population of lesser sandhill cranes, because during each major ice age, its present breeding range was frozen year-round. Still, sandhill cranes are amply documented from fossil and subfossil remains right to the modern era. Conceivably, they might be considered distinct species already, a monotypic G. canadensis and the greater sandhill crane, G. pratensis, which would include the other populations.

The scant differences between southern Canadian and western U.S. populations appear to result from genetic drift, due to the recent reduction in population and range fragmentation. Until the early 20th century, the southern migratory birds occupied a much larger and continuous range. Thus, the subspecies A. c. rowani may well be abandoned.

The two southern U.S. resident populations are somewhat more distinct. The Cuban population has been comparatively little studied, but appears to have been established on the island for a long time. They and the migratory greater sandhill cranes proper may form a group of lineages that diverged much later from a range in the southern U.S. and maybe northern Mexico, where they were resident. The southern migratory population would then represent a later re-expansion, which (re-)evolved their migratory habits independent from the northernmost birds, the geographically separated populations expanding rapidly when more habitat was available as the last ice age ended.

Behavior
Sandhill cranes are fairly social birds that usually live in pairs or family groups through the year. During migration and winter, unrelated cranes come together to form "survival groups" that forage and roost together. Such groups often congregate at migration and winter sites, sometimes in the thousands.

Diet
Sandhill cranes are mainly herbivorous, but eat various types of food, depending on availability. They often feed with their bills down to the ground as they root around for seeds and other foods, in shallow wetlands with vegetation or various upland habitats. Cranes readily eat cultivated foods such as corn, wheat, cottonseed, and sorghum. Waste corn is useful to cranes preparing for migration, providing them with nutrients for the long journey. Among northern races of sandhill cranes, their diet is most varied, especially among breeding birds. They variously feed on berries, small mammals, insects, snails, reptiles, and amphibians.

Breeding
Sandhill cranes raise one brood per year. In nonmigratory populations, laying begins between December and August. In migratory populations, laying usually begins in April or May. Both members of a breeding pair build the nest using plant material from the surrounding area. Nest sites are usually marshes, bogs, or swales, though occasionally on dry land. Females lay one to three (usually two) oval, dull brown eggs with reddish markings. Both parents incubate the eggs for about 30 days. The chicks are precocial; they hatch covered in down, with their eyes open, and able to leave the nest within a day. The parents brood the chicks for up to three weeks after hatching, feeding them intensively for the first few weeks, then gradually less frequently until they reach independence at 9 to 10 months old.

The chicks remain with their parents until one to two months before the parents lay the next clutch of eggs the following year, remaining with them for 10–12 months. After leaving their parents, the chicks form nomadic flocks with other juveniles and nonbreeders. They remain in these flocks until they form breeding pairs between two and seven years old.

Predators
As a conspicuous ground-dwelling species, sandhill cranes are at risk from a few predators. Corvids, such as ravens and crows, gulls, jaegers, raptors and mammals such as foxes, coyotes and racoons feed on young cranes and eggs. In Oregon and California, the most serious predators of chicks are reportedly coyotes, ravens, raccoons, American mink, and great horned owls, roughly in descending order. Cranes of all ages can be hunted by both North American species of eagles, bobcats, and possibly American alligators. Additionally, there is a report that even a much smaller peregrine falcon has successfully killed a  adult sandhill crane in a stoop.

Sandhill cranes defend themselves and their young from aerial predators by jumping and kicking. Actively brooding adults are more likely to react aggressively to potential predators to defend their chicks than wintering birds, which most often normally try to evade attacks on foot or in flight. For land predators such as dogs, foxes, and coyotes, they move forward, often hissing, with their wings open and bills pointed. If the predator persists, the crane stabs with its bill and kicks. They can even kill predators by piercing through the skull with their sharp beak, and even coyotes can be killed.

Status and conservation
In the 1930s, sandhill cranes were generally extirpated east of the Mississippi River, but their populations have recovered, with an estimated 98,000 in the region in 2018, a substantial increase over the previous year. Although sandhill cranes are not considered threatened as a species, the three southernmost subspecies are quite rare. Resident populations, not migratory birds, cannot choose secure breeding habitat. Many subpopulations were destroyed by hunting or habitat change. The greater sandhill crane proper initially suffered most; by 1940, probably fewer than 1,000 birds remained. Populations have since increased greatly again. At nearly 100,000, they are still fewer than the lesser sandhill crane, which, at about 400,000 individuals continent-wide, is the most plentiful extant crane.

Some migratory populations of sandhill cranes face population threats due to interspecies competition with snow geese. Since the 1990s, snow geese have eaten waste corn on which the cranes also rely prior to migration. Sandhill crane populations are also threatened by hunting. Hunting cranes is legal throughout the states of the Central Flyway, from the Dakotas and Wyoming south to Oklahoma and Texas. Nebraska is the sole state along the Central Flyway where hunting cranes is illegal. Despite losses from hunting, interspecies competition and other pressures such as habitat loss, the species has expanded its range. Since the early 2000s, the sandhill crane has expanded both its winter (nonbreeding) and breeding ranges northward, including into upstate New York.  In the 21st century, parts of the Midwestern United States have seen an extensive rebound of the species.

The transplantation of wild birds and introduction of captive-reared birds into suitable low-population areas have been called viable management techniques.

The Mississippi sandhill crane has lost the most range; it used to live along most of the northern Gulf of Mexico coast, and its range was once nearly parapatric with that of its eastern neighbor. As of 2013, about 25 breeding pairs exist in an intensively managed population. The Mississippi Sandhill Crane National Wildlife Refuge—established in 1975 when fewer than 35 of the birds existed—has the biggest release program for cranes on Earth, and 90% of the cranes there were raised in captivity. The second viable egg from a two-egg nest was occasionally removed from the nests, starting in 1965, to become part of a captive flock. This breeding flock is divided between the Audubon Institute's Species Survival Center and White Oak Conservation in Yulee, Florida. These cranes have produced offspring for annual releases into the refuge.

A Mississippi sandhill crane was the first bird to hatch from an egg fertilized by sperm that was thawed from a cryogenic state. This occurred at the Audubon Institute, as part of this subspecies' endangered species recovery plan.

About 300 Cuban sandhill cranes exist; this is the least known of the populations.

In January 2019, 25 to 30 thousand cranes (both greater and lesser subspecies) were found wintering at the Whitewater Draw State Wildlife Area near McNeal in southeast Arizona.

Sandhill cranes have been tried as foster parents for whooping cranes in reintroduction schemes. This failed when the whooping cranes imprinted on their foster parents, later did not recognize other whooping cranes as their conspecifics, and unsuccessfully tried to pair with sandhill cranes, instead.

Vagrancy
Sandhill cranes occasionally reach Europe as vagrants. The first British record was on Fair Isle in April 1981, and the second was in Shetland in 1991. Small groups have also been seen in parts of eastern China and Taiwan.  In 2022, reports emerged of regular sightings of sandhill cranes in New Brunswick, on the Atlantic coast of Canada.

Notes

See also
Cranes in Britain
Grulla National Wildlife Refuge
Muleshoe National Wildlife Refuge

References

Further reading

 Meine, Curt D. & Archibald, George W. (eds.) (1996). "Sandhill Crane (Grus canadensis)". In: The cranes: Status survey and conservation action plan. IUCN, Gland, Switzerland, and Cambridge, U.K.

External links

 International Crane Foundation's Sandhill Crane page
 Audio file of cranes "unison calling" at savingcranes.org
 Sandhill Crane Bird Sound at Florida Museum of Natural History
 Sandhill Crane Species Account – Cornell Lab of Ornithology
 Sandhill Crane – Grus canadensis – USGS Patuxent Bird Identification InfoCenter
 The Nature Conservancy's Species Profile: Sandhill Crane
 National Audubon Society, Rowe Sanctuary, Nebraska
 Sandhill Crane Migration on Nebraska Platte River – Viewing Sites Info & Maps, Photos, Video
 Alamosa/Monte Vista/Baca National Wildlife Refuge Complex 
 Mississippi Sandhill Crane National Wildlife Refuge
 
 Stamps (for Canada, Cuba) with Range Map at bird-stamps.com
 Sandhill Crane Migrations Revealed by Satellites   Documentary produced by Oregon Field Guide
 Sandhill cranes breeding and biology in Alaska at christyyuncker.com
 
Música de las Grullas: Una historia natural de las grullas de América (2014) by Paul Johnsgard, Enrique Weir, & Karine Gil-Weir

 
 

sandhill crane
Birds of North America
Birds of Canada
Birds of Cuba
Birds of the Caribbean
Native birds of the Western United States
Native birds of Alaska
Wading birds
sandhill crane
Articles containing video clips
Taxa named by Carl Linnaeus
Taxobox binomials not recognized by IUCN